Cary Ernst Harth (born February 2, 1970) is a Canadian character actor.

Life and career
Harth was born in Galt, Ontario, Canada. He got his first role of acting as a kindergartner when the drama club cast the school's largest child to play Santa in their Christmas pageant. Involved in community theatre and improvisational comedy during high school, it wasn't until he relocated to Vancouver in 1989 that he seriously pursued acting full-time. Prior to landing his first professional gig in a TV commercial for a food chain, Harth toured the semi-pro wrestling circuit in Canada's small towns and provinces as The Bible Thumper, adorned in black robes with a cross shaved on his head.

He made his professional acting debut in Green Dolphin Beat, a Spelling telefilm for Fox. He has since guest-starred in the black and white episode of The X-Files, been Saved on TNT, co-starred with Carmen Electra as her bodyguard, Eightball, in MTV's Monster Island, wrestled Beau Bridges in Hallmark's Voyage of the Unicorn and appeared in other television series such as Millennium, Harsh Realm, The Dead Zone and The Outer Limits.

On the big screen, Harth's credits include portraying Lowell Lee Andrews in the multi-awarded Capote (with Philip Seymour Hoffman), racing through downtown Vancouver with Ice Cube in Are We There Yet?, chasing Scooby and Shaggy as Miner 49er in Scooby Doo 2: Monsters Unleashed, Thir13en Ghosts, Say It Isn't So, Dreamcatcher, Camouflage, Dudley Do-Right, Excess Baggage, Smokin' Aces 2: Assassins' Ball and Dead Rising: Watchtower.

Filmography

Notes

External links

 

1970 births
Living people
Canadian male film actors
Canadian male television actors
Canadian male voice actors
Male actors from Ontario
20th-century Canadian male actors
21st-century Canadian male actors